Giovanni Maria Quaglio (c. 1700-1765) was an Austrian stage designer of Italian extraction.  He worked mainly in Vienna, where he designed the original production of Christoph Willibald Gluck's Orfeo ed Euridice in 1762. He studied in Rome and Milan.

References

James Anderson, The Complete Dictionary of Opera and Operetta.
BMLO entry (German)

1700 births
1765 deaths
Austrian scenic designers
Opera designers